"How many angels can dance on the head of a pin?" (alternatively "How many angels can stand on the point of a pin?") is a phrase that, when used in modern contexts, can be used as a metaphor for wasting time debating topics of no practical value, or on questions whose answers hold no intellectual consequence, while more urgent concerns accumulate.

The phrase was originally used in a theological context by 17th century Protestants to mock medieval scholastics such as  Duns Scotus and Thomas Aquinas and the angelology of the period in particular. 

The phrase has also been associated with the fall of Constantinople, with the assertion that scholars debated the topic while Turks besieged the city.

Origin
Thomas Aquinas's Summa Theologica, written , includes discussion of several questions regarding angels such as, "Can several angels be in the same place?" However, the idea that such questions had a prominent place in medieval scholarship has been debated, and it has not been proven whether or not this particular question has been debated. One theory is that it is an early modern fabrication, used to discredit scholastic philosophy at a time when it still played a significant role in university education. James Franklin has raised the scholarly issue, and mentions that there is a 17th-century reference in William Chillingworth's Religion of Protestants (1637), where he accuses unnamed scholastics of debating "whether a Million of Angels may not fit upon a Needle's point?"
This is earlier than a reference in the 1678 The True Intellectual System Of The Universe by Ralph Cudworth. Helen S. Lang, author of Aristotle's Physics and its Medieval Varieties (1992), says (p. 284):

Peter Harrison (2016) has suggested that the first reference to angels dancing on a needle's point occurs in an expository work by the English divine (minister), William Sclater (1575–1626).
In An exposition with notes upon the first Epistle to the Thessalonians (1619), Sclater claimed that scholastic philosophers occupied themselves with such pointless questions as whether angels "did occupie a place; and so, whether many might be in one place at one time; and how many might sit on a Needles point; and six hundred such like needlesse points."<ref>William Sclater, 'An Exposition with Notes Upon the First and Second Epistles to the Thessalonians, p 385. (Google Books)</ref>
Harrison proposes that the reason an English writer first introduced the "needle’s point" into a critique of medieval angelology is that it makes for a pun on "needless point".

A letter written to The Times in 1975 identified a close parallel in a 14th-century mystical text, the Swester Katrei. However, the reference is to souls sitting on a needle: tusent selen siczen in dem himelrich uff einer nadel spicz — "in heaven a thousand souls can sit on the point of a needle."

Dorothy L. Sayers argued that the question was "simply a debating exercise" and that the answer "usually adjudged correct" was stated as, "Angels are pure intelligences, not material, but limited, so that they have location in space, but not extension." Sayers compares the question to that of how many people's thoughts can be concentrated upon a particular pin at the same time. She concludes that infinitely many angels can be located on the head of a pin, since they do not occupy any space there:
The practical lesson to be drawn from the argument is not to use words like "there" in a loose, unscientific way, without specifying whether you mean "located there" or "occupying space there."

In Italian, French, Spanish and Portuguese, the conundrum of useless scholarly debates is linked to a similar question of whether angels are sexless or have a sex. In Polish, instead of angels the question is about devils.

See also

 Argumentation theory
 Balloon debate
 Discourse
 Law of triviality
 Narcissism of small differences
 Pedantry

Notes

References

Further reading
 Franklin, J., "Heads of Pins" in: Australian Mathematical Society Gazette, vol. 20, n. 4, 1993.
 Harrison, Peter. "Angels on Pinheads and Needles’ Points", Notes and Queries, 63 (2016), 45-47.
 Howard, Philip (1983), Words Fail Me, summary of correspondence in The Times on the matter
 Kennedy, D. J., "Thomism", in the Catholic Encyclopedia Koetsier, T. & Bergmans, L. (eds.), Mathematics and the Divine: a historical study'', Ch. 14 by Edith Sylla (review)

External links

 

Angelology
Scholasticism
Latin proverbs
Philosophical phrases
17th-century neologisms
Quotations from literature
Quotations from religion
Quotations from military
Quotations from philosophy
English phrases